Peter of Compostela is the name given to the author of De consolatione rationis (The Consolation of Reason). This was a prosimetrum based on Boethius's Consolation of Philosophy. He is now thought to have been a grammar teacher in Santiago de Compostela between 1317 and 1330, but was previously conjectured to have been a bishop in the twelfth century.

References 

Year of birth unknown
Year of death unknown
14th-century Roman Catholic theologians
14th-century Spanish writers
Spanish male writers
14th-century Castilians
14th-century Spanish philosophers